Phyllosma is a genus of flowering plants belonging to the family Rutaceae.

Its native range is South African Republic.

Species
Species:

Phyllosma barosmoides 
Phyllosma capensis

References

Zanthoxyloideae
Zanthoxyloideae genera